Spilapterida is an extinct family of palaeodictyopterans. It is regarded as one of the most species-rich of its order.

Subdivisions 
Subtaxa listed are genera, and all are extinct, unless otherwise noted.

 Abaptilon
 Baeoneura
 Becquerelia
 Bizarrea
 Boltoniella
 Delitzschala
 Dunbaria
 Epitethe
 Epithele
 Homaloneura
 Lamproptilia
 Mcluckiepteron
 Neuburgia
 Palaeoneuriinae (subfamily)
 Palaeoptilus
 Paradunbaria
 Permiakovia
 Sinodunbaria
 Spilaptera
 Spiloptilus
 Tectoptilus
 Tytthospilaptera
 Vorkutoneura

References 

Prehistoric insect families
Palaeodictyopteroidea